Paul "Watty" Watson (born March 16, 1952) is an American cornetist, guitarist, trumpet  player, singer, composer, and songwriter living in Richmond, Virginia. He is best known for his work with The Orthotonics, FSK, Sparklehorse, and Patrick Phelan. He currently plays cornet, provides backing vocals, and writes for the Brooklyn-based band, And the Wiremen.

Personal life 
Watson was born in Monkey's Eyebrow, Kentucky. He now lives in Virginia.

Selected discography 
1979 – Idio Savant – Shakers in a Tantrum Landscape
1981 – Alchemical Rowdies – Trans-Idio
1982 – Ortho-tonics – Accessible As Gravity
1984 – 1/2 Japanese – Our Solar System
1984 – Orthotonics – Wake Up You Must Remember
1985 – Half Japanese – Sing No Evil
1986 – F.A.F.O.O.T. – FA3574
1989 – House Of Freaks – Tantilla +13
1990 – Half Japanese – We Are They Who Ache With Amorous Love
1993 – FSK – The Sound Of Music
1995 – Sparklehorse – London
1995 – Sparklehorse – Vivadixiesubmarinetransmissionplot
1996 – FSK – International
1998 – Rattlemouth – Fist Full Of Iffy
1998 – Sparklehorse – Good Morning Spider
1999 – Michael Hurley – Weatherhole
1999 – One Ring Zero – Tranz Party
2000 – The Blasco Ballroom – Film
2000 – Patrick Phelan – Songs Of Patrick Phelan
2000 – Cracker – Garage D'Or
2001 – Patrick Phelan – Parlor
2001 – A Camp – A Camp
2001 – Dexter Romweber – Chased By Martians
2001 – Griefbirds – Paper Radio
2002 – Cordero – Lamb Lost In The City
2004 – Tulsa Drone – No Wake
2006 – Ostinato – Chasing The Form
2006 – Tanakh – Ardent Fevers
2006 – Sarah White – White Light
2007 – Gachupin – Gachupin
2010 – And the Wiremen – And the Wiremen
2012 - Bee and Flower - Suspension
2012 - Jonathan Vassar and the Speckled Bird - Sky and Country
2014 - Paul Watson - My Secret Effect

External links 
 Paul Watson on Myspace
 Review of Griefbirds "Paper Radio"
 Recording of F.A.F.O.O.T. at the Free Music Archive

1952 births
Living people
American male guitarists
American rock guitarists
American male singers
American male composers
20th-century American composers
American cornetists
20th-century American guitarists
20th-century American male musicians